The 2012 Scotland Sevens was the sixth edition of the tournament previously known as the Edinburgh Sevens. It was the eighth tournament within the 2011–12 IRB Sevens World Series. The host stadium was the Scotstoun Stadium.

New Zealand won the title by defeating England 29–14 in the final.

Format
The teams were divided into pools of four teams, who played a round-robin within the pool. Points were awarded in each pool on a different schedule from most rugby tournaments—3 for a win, 2 for a draw, 1 for a loss.
The top two teams in each pool advanced to the Cup competition. The four quarterfinal losers dropped into the bracket for the Plate. The Bowl was contested by the third- and fourth-place finishers in each pool, with the losers in the Bowl quarterfinals dropping into the bracket for the Shield.

Teams
The participating teams were:

Pool stage
The draw was made on 1 April.

Pool A

Pool B

Pool C

Pool D

Knockout stage

Shield

Bowl

Plate

Cup

References

External links

Scotland Sevens
Scotland Sevens
Scotland Sevens
Scotland Sevens